The 1983–84 Illinois Fighting Illini men's basketball team represented the University of Illiniois.

Regular season
The 1983–84 season brought Illinois its 12th Big Ten Conference championship in a season where Illinois had four overtime games including an epic four-overtime 75–66 victory over Michigan. The next game was a two-overtime win at Iowa, Lou Henson’s 400th victory as a college head coach. The Illini recorded a 26-5 mark and were 15-3 in Big Ten play, tying Purdue for the league title. This season also marked Illinois’ first back-to-back 20 win seasons since 1951–52. The Illini would go on to record a total of nine consecutive 20-win seasons from 1982–83 to 1990–91. Illinois advanced to the NCAA Regional Finals before dropping a heart-breaking 54–51 loss to Kentucky on its home court, causing the NCAA to put a rule in place not allowing a school to play in a tournament game on its home court.  Rumors also were floated that the outcome was predetermined, with home team time clock operations being implicated in part.

Roster

Source

Schedule

Source

|-
!colspan=12 style="background:#DF4E38; color:white;"| Non-Conference regular season

|-
!colspan=9 style="background:#DF4E38; color:#FFFFFF;"|Big Ten regular season	

|-
!colspan=9 style="text-align: center; background:#DF4E38"|NCAA Tournament

|-

Player stats

Awards and honors
 Bruce Douglas
United Press International 3rd team All-American
Big Ten Player of the Year
Team Co-Most Valuable Player
Fighting Illini All-Century team (2005)
Quinn Richardson
Team Co-Most Valuable Player

Team players drafted into the NBA
No one from the Fighting Illini was selected in the 1984 NBA Draft.

Rankings

References

Illinois Fighting Illini
Illinois Fighting Illini men's basketball seasons
Illinois
Illinois Fight
Illinois Fight